Simon Aspelin and Julian Knowle were the defending champions, but Knowle chose not to participate, and only Aspelin competed that year.
Aspelin partnered with Thomas Johansson, but lost in the semifinals to Jonas Björkman and Robin Söderling.

Jonas Björkman and Robin Söderling won in the final 6–2, 6–2, against Johan Brunström and Jean-Julien Rojer.

Seeds

Draw

Draw

External links
Draw

Doubles
2008 ATP Tour